Billy Jordan Daniels (born 3 July 1994) is an English professional footballer who currently plays for Hednesford Town. During his career, he has played as both a forward and a midfielder.

Career

Coventry City
Born in Bristol, Daniels progressed through Coventry's academy to sign his first professional contract in May 2012. His professional debut for Coventry came on 14 August 2012, in a 1–0 victory over Dagenham & Redbridge in the Football League Cup.

Billy Daniels signed a contract extension in the summer of 2013. On 11 August 2013 Billy Daniels scored his first two goals in professional football in a 5–4 win for Coventry against Bristol City, including what turned out to be the winning goal. The win against Bristol City was particularly important to Daniels due to him growing up supporting their city rivals Bristol Rovers. The game was notable for being the first time Coventry played at Sixfields Stadium after their failure to agree a deal with the owners of the Ricoh Arena.

Daniels followed this brace up by scoring in Coventry's away win against Carlisle United in the following league game. However, his progress has been halted by both the return of Coventry captain Carl Baker to the right wing position that Daniels had been occupying and also a hernia problem that has limited him to sparse substitute appearance in September and October 2013. After his career Billy Daniels is now a P.E teacher.

Loan to Cheltenham Town
On 27 March 2014, Daniels joined League Two side Cheltenham Town on a 28-day loan.

Notts County
On 15 January 2015, Daniels signed for League One team Notts County for an undisclosed fee, on an 18-month contract.

Nuneaton Town
On 1 September 2015, Daniels joined National League North team Nuneaton Town

Kidderminster Harriers
On 13 July 2018, Daniels joined National League North team Kidderminster Harriers on a one-year deal.

Hednesford Town
On 5 August 2019 Hednesford Town announced the signing of Daniels from Nuneaton Borough.

Career statistics
Stats according to 

A.  The "Other" column constitutes appearances and goals (including substitutes) in the Football League Trophy.

References

External links

1994 births
Footballers from Bristol
Living people
English footballers
Association football forwards
Coventry City F.C. players
Cheltenham Town F.C. players
Notts County F.C. players
Kidderminster Harriers F.C. players
Nuneaton Borough F.C. players
Hednesford Town F.C. players
English Football League players